The United States Post Office in Astoria, Oregon, United States, is a historic building constructed in 1933. It is a two-story building on a raised basement. Its 11-bay front facade is divided by flat fluted pilasters with Corinthian capitals supporting a full entablature, with a balustraded parapet above, and a red-tiled hipped roof rising behind that. Its foundations had to be blasted by dynamite.

It was listed on the National Register of Historic Places in 1985 under its historic name U.S. Post Office and Custom House.

See also
National Register of Historic Places listings in Clatsop County, Oregon

References

External links

, National Register of Historic Places cover documentation

National Register of Historic Places in Astoria, Oregon
Significant US Post Offices in Oregon 1900-1941 TR
Government buildings completed in 1933
1933 establishments in Oregon
Individually listed contributing properties to historic districts on the National Register in Oregon
Custom houses on the National Register of Historic Places